The Marine Regiment was the naval infantry of the Royal Dano-Norwegian Navy, and later an infantry regiment, established in 1672 by Christian IV and based at Glückstadt Naval Station.

History
The Marine Regiment was a Danish-Norwegian unit, which was established in 1672 with Captain Vogel as commanding officer and its garrison at Naval Station Glückstadt in the town of Glückstadt at the Elbe in Holstein. Before the regiment was raised, Danish warships always had a group of regular soldiers on board, whose job it was to fire on decks, rigging and the hallway of enemy ships and capture them. However, having Army and Navy troops on the same ship created command and organisational problems, as ships had two commanders, one commanding the ship and responsible for maneuvring and navigation and one commanding the soldiers. Raising the Marine Regiment under Navy command removed these problems.

It was considered a punishment to be a mariner (Marine), and the recruitment base for the regiment included individuals who could not adapt to other regiments. This created a tradition of extremely hardy soldiers. Even among sailors these soldiers were feared and hated. But one thing you could not deprive them was their fighting spirit and courage. The unit fought honourably in many battles, regardless of the Danish efforts in general. 
In several battles the Regiment received permission to leave the battlefield with weapons in hand as recognition for their efforts.

In 1741, it moved to Rendsburg and changed its name to Bornholm Infantry Regiment.

Units
From 1951 the battalions from the Marineregiment was under the command of Bornholms Defends

Disband units 
  1st battalion (I/BV), Motorized infantry Battalion.(1951-2000)   
  2nd battalion (II/BV), Motorized infantry Battalion. (1951-2000)  
  3rd battalion (III/BV), Infantry Battalion. (1986-1996)

Names of the regiment

Standards

References

Bibliography

External links
Marineregimentets history
Marineregimentet and Denmark

Disbanded marine forces
Royal Dano-Norwegian Navy
Military units and formations established in 1672
Military units and formations disestablished in 2000
Infantry units and formations
Military of Denmark
Military of Norway
1672 establishments in Denmark
Marine regiments